Mallahle (also Mallali or Aruku) is a stratovolcano on the border of Ethiopia and Eritrea, with a 6 km wide caldera.

Mallahle is the highest peak in the Afdera region of Ethiopia. It is located in the Danakil Horst at the southern end of the Danakil Alps. It makes up part of the Bidu volcanic complex (with the Nabro Volcano, Bara Ale and Sork Ale).

References

Stratovolcanoes of Ethiopia
Calderas of Ethiopia
Calderas of Eritrea